Laura Capon Fermi (Rome, 16 June 1907 – Chicago, 26 December 1977) was an Italian and naturalized-American writer and political activist. She was the wife of Nobel Prize physicist Enrico Fermi.

Biography 
Laura Capon was born in Rome in 1907.  Capon met Enrico Fermi while she was a student in general science at the University of Rome.  The couple married in 1928.

They had two children: a daughter, Nella (1931–1995), and a son, Giulio (1936–1997), named after Enrico's older brother, who had died in 1915. In 1936 Laura joined Ginestra Amaldi, wife of Edoardo Amaldi, to write a book relating alchemy and the nuclear transmutation performed by their spouses.

In 1938, the Fermis emigrated to the United States to escape the anti-Jewish laws of the Fascist government of Benito Mussolini; Laura was Jewish. Though Fermi's prestige and membership in the Royal Academy of Italy could have mitigated the impact of the laws, they chose to leave instead. They traveled to Stockholm to receive Fermi's Nobel prize, and left from Stockholm for the United States, where Fermi had accepted a position at Columbia University. They were naturalized as Americans in 1944.

In 1954 Laura resumed writing. Her book Atoms in the Family, about her life with Enrico, appeared shortly before he died of stomach cancer. 

In August 1955 Laura traveled to Geneva for the International Conference for the Peaceful Use of Atomic Energy which led to the International Atomic Energy Agency. Laura Fermi was the Official Historian of the Conference and published Atoms for the World, reporting on its proceedings.

Her book Illustrious Immigrants was about "Many of Europe's most intelligent and best-trained men and women, who immediately became visible to middle class America as neighbors, teachers and colleagues" in the years 1930 to 1941. They were, "men and women who came to America fully made, so to speak, with their PhD's and diplomas from art academies or music conservatories in their pockets, and who continued to engage in intellectual pursuits in this country." She noted, "Life was initially hard for many physicians, but it was the lawyers whose training proved least exportable and who most frequently had to find a new means of livelihood." Considering the extent of the influence of the immigrants, an evaluation of the impact of the migration is restricted to two fields: psychoanalysis and nuclear science.

Laura Fermi died of cardiac arrest in 1977.

Published works
 1936: (with Ginestra Amaldi) Alchimia del Tempo Nostro (Italian)
 1954: Atoms in the Family: My Life with Enrico Fermi, University of Chicago Press 
 1957: Atoms for the World: United States participation in the Conference on the Peaceful uses of Atomic Energy, University of Chicago Press, 
 1961: Mussolini, University of Chicago Press
 1961: The Story of Atomic Energy, Random House
 1961: (with ) Galileo and the Scientific Revolution, Basic Books 
 1968: Illustrious Immigrants: The Intellectual Migration from Europe 1930–41, University of Chicago Press,  via Internet Archive

References

Further reading
 Lawrence Badash, J.O. Hirschfelder & H.P. Broida editors (1980) Reminiscences of Los Alamos 1943–1945 (Studies in the History of Modern Science), Springer, .

External links
 Olivia Fermi (2014) Laura Fermi's Life from The Fermi Effect
 Nella Fermi Weiner (1994) Biography of Laura Fermi
 Guide to the Laura Fermi Papers 1922-1977 at the University of Chicago Special Collections Research Center 

1907 births
1977 deaths
Women biographers
Italian anti-war activists
20th-century Italian Jews
Naturalized citizens of the United States
Italian emigrants to the United States
Enrico Fermi